Tounde Adekounle (born December 20, 1988 in Masséda) is a Togolese footballer, who currently plays for US Masseda.

Career
Adekounle began his career in the youth from US Masseda and played with the team at CAF Confederation Cup 2008. He left US Masseda on November 5, 2008 to join Ghanaian club Liberty Professionals F.C. on loan.

References

External links
 

1988 births
Living people
Togolese footballers
Togo international footballers
Togo youth international footballers
Expatriate footballers in Ghana
Liberty Professionals F.C. players
Togolese expatriates in Ghana
Association football forwards
21st-century Togolese people